The 1980 Asian Taekwondo Championships were the 4th edition of the Asian Taekwondo Championships, and were held in Taipei from 14 to 16 November, 1980.

Medal summary

Medal table

See also
 List of sporting events in Taiwan

References

Results

External links
WT Official Website

Asian Championships
Asian Taekwondo Championships
Asian Taekwondo Championships
Taekwondo Championships